Visions of the Future is a 2007 documentary television series aired on  the BBC Four television channel. The series stars theoretical physicist and futurist Michio Kaku as he documents cutting edge science.

There are three installments in the series.

Episodes

The Intelligence Revolution
 The Intelligence Revolution - Kaku explains how he believes artificial intelligence will revolutionize the world. Also, Kaku investigates virtual reality technology and its potential. Controversially, Kaku documents the work of scientists using a combination of artificial intelligence and neuroscience technology transform a person suffering from major depressive disorder into one who is happy and content by the push of a button.

List of technologies:
Autonomous car
Ubiquitous computing and Internet of things
E-textiles
Head-mounted display
Virtual retinal display
Virtual reality
Augmented reality
Immersive virtual reality
Robotics and artificial intelligence
Cyborgology, Bionics and human enhancement

The Biotech Revolution
 The Biotech Revolution - This episode focuses mainly on recent advances in genetics and biotechnology. Amongst other things Kaku documents advances in DNA screening, gene therapy and lab-grown organ transplants.

List of technologies:
Whole genome sequencing and personalized medicine
Genetic engineering
Gene therapy
Designer baby
Cancer Genome Project
Regenerative medicine
Tissue engineering, Printable organs
Cell therapy
Immunomodulation therapy
Life extension
Sirtuin 1
Transhumanism

The Quantum Revolution
 The Quantum Revolution - Kaku investigates the advances of quantum physics and the effects it could have on the average human life. Kaku looks at the work of science fiction writers and the way that many concepts conceived for entertainment could in fact become reality. Kaku also speculates about the effects that such technology may have on the future of the human species.

List of technologies:
High-temperature superconductivity
Metamaterial
Carbon nanotube
Space elevator
Nuclear fusion
Nanotechnology
Nanorobotics
Molecular assembler
Quantum teleportation

External links 
 
 

2007 British television series debuts
2007 British television series endings
BBC high definition shows
BBC television documentaries
2000s British television miniseries
English-language television shows
Documentary television series about computing
Futurology documentaries